This is the complete list of Asian Games medalists in field hockey from 1958 to 2014.

Men

Women

References

Asian Games History

External links
Olympic Council of Asia

Field hockey
medalists